Jokerman is a decorative typeface created in 1995 by British designer Andrew K. Smith. It employs dots, spirals and straight lines that can be either attached or placed near each letter or integrated into the character to create negative space. It is described by Microsoft as having "fanciful internal and external elements". Smith named the typeface after the Bob Dylan song "Jokerman".

Repertoire
International Typeface Corporation have issued two Jokerman typefaces: Jokerman and Jokerman Hellenic. Jokerman Hellenic includes glyphs for the Greek alphabet.

Usage

As a decorative display typeface, Jokerman is mostly used for humor and vitality. It has not yet seen commercial usage on television. Jokerman is commonly used as a display for signage and branding, notably in coffee shops, beverage bars, and even cafeterias due to its complicated shapes.

See also
Samples of display typefaces

References

Microsoft typefaces
Typography
International Typeface Corporation typefaces